Aghjivan (also Romanized as Āghjīvān; also known as Āghjavān and Āghjovān) is a village in Behi Dehbokri Rural District, Simmineh District, Bukan County, West Azerbaijan Province, Iran. At the 2006 census, its population was 661, in 124 families.

References 

Populated places in Bukan County